Triops newberryi is a species of Triops found on the western coast of North America, commonly in valleys throughout the states of Washington, Oregon, California, and small areas of Nevada, Utah, New Mexico, and Mexico, with at least one disjunct population in Kansas. They are found in vast numbers though in the Coachella Valley in California. T. newberryi has been reported to have potential as a biocontrol agent for larval mosquitoes breeding in seasonally-flooded habitats. T. newberryi is genetically distinct from T. longicaudatus, the dominant species in the Central United States.

In captivity
Though Triops newberryi is the species most likely to be encountered in the wild on the west coast of North America, it is far less common than Triops cancriformis and Triops longicaudatus in captivity, and is considered a more 'exotic' species among hobbyists.

References

Notostraca
Freshwater crustaceans of North America
Crustaceans of the United States
Fauna of the Southwestern United States
Fauna of the Colorado Desert
Fauna of the Mojave Desert
Fauna of the Sonoran Desert
Biological control agents of pest insects
Crustaceans described in 1921
Taxa named by Oldfield Thomas